The glossy flowerpiercer (Diglossa lafresnayii) is a species of bird in the family Thraupidae. It is found in Colombia, Ecuador, Peru, and Venezuela.

Its natural habitats are subtropical or tropical moist montane forests, subtropical or tropical high-altitude grassland, and heavily degraded former forest.

References

glossy flowerpiercer
Birds of the Colombian Andes
Birds of the Ecuadorian Andes
Birds of the Venezuelan Andes
glossy flowerpiercer
Taxonomy articles created by Polbot